The 2018–19 First League of the Republika Srpska was the twenty-fourth season of the First League of the Republika Srpska, the second tier football league of Bosnia and Herzegovina, since its original establishment and the seventeenth as a second tier league.

Teams

 FK Borac Banja Luka
 FK Drina Zvornik
 FK Kozara Gradiška
 FK Modriča 
 FK Podrinje Janja
 FK Rudar Prijedor
 FK Slavija Sarajevo
 FK Sloboda Mrkonjić Grad
 FK Sloga Gornje Crnjelovo
 FK Sutjeska Foča
 FK Tekstilac Derventa
 FK Željezničar Banja Luka

Regular season

Promotion round

Relegation round

See also
2018–19 Premier League of Bosnia and Herzegovina
2018–19 First League of the Federation of Bosnia and Herzegovina
2018–19 Bosnia and Herzegovina Football Cup

References

External links
Official site for the Football Federation of Bosnia and Herzegovina
Official site for the Football Federation of the Republika of Srpska

 

Bos
2
First League of the Republika Srpska seasons